Vagiz Nazirovich Khidiyatullin (born 3 March 1959 in Gubakha, Perm Oblast, Russian SFSR) is a former footballer who played as central defender.

He earned 58 caps and scored 6 goals for the Soviet Union national football team, and played for them in the 1980 Summer Olympics, 1988 UEFA European Championship and the 1990 FIFA World Cup (also included in the 1982 FIFA World Cup squad, but did not play). He was the founder and President of Russian Professional Players Trade Union and is of Tatar origin.

Honours
Soviet Top League (all with Spartak Moscow)
 Champion (2): 1979, 1987
 Runner-up, silver (1): 1980
 Runner-up, bronze (1): 1986

Russian Premier League
 Runner-up, silver (1): 1994 with Dynamo Moscow

Russian Cup
Winner (1): 1994 with Dynamo Moscow

1980 Summer Olympics
 Runner-up, bronze (1): 1980

Euro 1988
 Runner-up, silver (1): 1988

U-20 FIFA World Cup
 Champion (1): 1977

U-19 UEFA Championship
 Champion, (1): 1976

References

External links
 
 
 
 

1959 births
Living people
People from Gubakha
Tatar people of Russia
1982 FIFA World Cup players
1990 FIFA World Cup players
Expatriate footballers in France
FC Dynamo Moscow players
FC Spartak Moscow players
Footballers at the 1980 Summer Olympics
Olympic bronze medalists for the Soviet Union
Olympic footballers of the Soviet Union
PFC CSKA Moscow players
Soviet Top League players
Ligue 1 players
Russian Premier League players
Russian footballers
Russian expatriate footballers
Soviet expatriate sportspeople in France
Soviet expatriate footballers
Soviet footballers
Soviet Union international footballers
Toulouse FC players
UEFA Euro 1988 players
Olympic medalists in football
Medalists at the 1980 Summer Olympics
Association football defenders
Tatar sportspeople
Montauban FCTG players
Sportspeople from Perm Krai